Bonnat is a commune in the Creuse department in the Nouvelle-Aquitaine region in France.

Geography

Miscellany
The commune owns and manages a nearby chateau de Mornay which has its own racing circuit for cars and motorbikes and is used for corporate functions. It also owns a restaurant in the town near to the church. 
A small stream flows by the southern border of the town on which stands a recently renovated lavoir (wash-house). 
A recent development of a very large book repository on land owned by the commune has caused some concern locally because of extensive lorry traffic on the narrow rural roads.

Population

Sights
 The church of St. Sylvain, dating from the thirteenth century.
 An ancient public washhouse.
 Three chateaux.

See also
Communes of the Creuse department

References

Communes of Creuse
County of La Marche